Commerce High School is a 3A high school based in Commerce, Texas. It is part of the Commerce Independent School District located in northeast Hunt County.  In 2013, the school was rated Met Standard by the Texas Education Agency.

Athletics

The Commerce Tigers compete in the following sports - 

Cross Country, Volleyball, Football, Basketball, Powerlifting, Golf, Tennis, Track, Softball & Baseball

State Titles
Commerce (UIL)

Football - 
1999 (3A/D2), 2001 (3A/D2)

Commerce Norris (PVIL)

Boys Basketball - 
1964 (PVIL-1A)

State Finalists
Football - 
1995(3A), 1997(3A)

Notable alumni
Justin Rogers, former NFL player
Wade Wilson, former NFL player and coach
 Jeana Yeager, aviator

References

External links

Commerce ISD

Schools in Hunt County, Texas
Public high schools in Texas